Wildenstein is a village and commune in the Haut-Rhin département of north-eastern France.

Wildenstein may also refer to:

Places
Château de Wildenstein, a ruined castle in the Alsace, France
Lac de Kruth-Wildenstein, a lake in Haut-Rhin, France
Wildenstein Castle (Bubendorf), a castle in Bubendorf, Basel-Land, Switzerland
Wildenstein Castle (Leibertingen), a castle in Baden-Württemberg, Germany
Wildenstein & Company Building, in Manhattan, New York

People
Georges Wildenstein (1892–1963), French gallery owner, art dealer, art collector, editor and art historian
Daniel Wildenstein (1917–2001), art dealer and scholar, and a thoroughbred race horse owner and breeder, son of Georges Wildenstein
Alec N. Wildenstein (1940–2008), French, art dealer and racehorse owner, son of Daniel Wildenstein
Jocelyn Wildenstein (born 1940), Swiss-American New York socialite and icon known for extensive facial surgeries, ex-wife of Alec Wildenstein
Guy Wildenstein (born 1945), French-American art dealer and racehorse owner, son of Daniel Wildenstein and head of the Wildenstein institute

Other
Wildenstein Index Number, an item in a numerical system published in catalogues by Daniel Wildenstein
Prix Daniel Wildenstein, a Group 2 flat horse race in France
The Wildenstein Institute, a center for art history research

Jewish surnames
Yiddish-language surnames